Çaykent is a village in the Çayırlı District, Erzincan Province, Turkey. The village had a population of 199 in 2021.

The hamlet of Beyinağılı is attached to it.

Population 
Population history of the village:

References 

Villages in Çayırlı District